Krom Stone House at 31 Upper Whitfield Road is a historic home located at Rochester in Ulster County, New York.  It is a -story stone dwelling in a linear plan built about 1764.  At the rear is a four-bay, 2-story frame ell dating to about 1879.

It was listed on the National Register of Historic Places in 1995.

References

Houses on the National Register of Historic Places in New York (state)
Houses completed in 1764
Houses in Ulster County, New York
1764 establishments in the Province of New York
National Register of Historic Places in Ulster County, New York